Barron may refer to:

Places 
Barron County, Wisconsin, United States
Barron, Wisconsin, city, United States
Barron (town), Wisconsin, town, United States
Barrón, village, Spain
Barron Field, an airfield in Everman, Texas, U.S.
Barron, Queensland, a suburb of Cairns, Australia
Barron Gorge National Park in Queensland, Australia
Barron River (disambiguation), a name of several rivers

People
Barron (surname), a Scottish surname
Barron Clan, a sept of the Scots Clan Rose
Barron Field (author)
Barron Hilton, American business magnate
Barron Trump, son of Donald Trump

Other 
Barron v. Baltimore, a U.S. Supreme Court case regarding states' rights
Barron's Educational Series, a U.S. publisher
Barron's (newspaper), a financial weekly
Barron (horse), an Olympic show jumping horse

See also
Barron's (disambiguation) (also Barrons)
Baron (disambiguation)
Baranov (disambiguation)